Ryan Patrick Dorow (born August 21, 1995) is an American professional baseball infielder in the Texas Rangers organization. He made his Major League Baseball (MLB) debut in 2021.

Amateur career
Dorow attended South Haven High School in South Haven, Michigan. Undrafted out of high school in 2013, he attended Adrian College to play college baseball for the Bulldogs. He was a four-year starter at shortstop for Adrian from 2014 through 2017. He played for the Battle Creek Bombers of the Northwoods League in 2016. Dorow was drafted by the Texas Rangers in the 30th round, with the 914th overall selection, of the 2017 MLB draft.

Professional career
He split his professional debut season of 2017 between the AZL Rangers of the Rookie-level Arizona League and the Hickory Crawdads of the Class A South Atlantic League, hitting a combined .297/.381/.391/.772 with 17 RBI. He spent the 2018 season with Hickory, hitting .271/.342/.425/.767 with 12 home runs and 61 RBI. Dorow split the 2019 season between the Down East Wood Ducks of the Class A-Advanced Carolina League and the Frisco RoughRiders of the Double-A Texas League, hitting a combined .243/.351/.368/.719 with 12 home runs and 61 RBI. Dorow did not play in 2020, with the cancelation of the minor league season due to the COVID 19 pandemic. He split the 2021 minor league season between Frisco and the Round Rock Express of the Triple-A West, hitting a combined .255/.333/.461/.794 with 15 home runs and 47 RBI.

The Rangers promoted Dorow to the major leagues on August 24, 2021. Due to 2021 MLB COVID outbreak rules, his addition to the 40-man roster was temporary. He made his major league debut on August 26. He was returned to Round Rock on September 1. Dorow spent the 2022 season back with Round Rock, hitting 237/.322/.353/.675 with 6 home runs and 44 RBI.

References

External links

Adrian Bulldogs bio

1995 births
Living people
People from South Haven, Michigan
Baseball players from Michigan
Major League Baseball infielders
Texas Rangers players
Adrian Bulldogs baseball players
Arizona League Rangers players
Hickory Crawdads players
Down East Wood Ducks players
Frisco RoughRiders players
Round Rock Express players